The mangrove whistler (Pachycephala cinerea) is a species of bird in the family Pachycephalidae found in South-east Asia.

Taxonomy and systematics
Alternate names for the mangrove whistler include the grey thickhead and white-bellied whistler. The latter name should not be confused with the species of the same name, Pachycephala leucogastra. Formerly, both the green-backed and white-vented whistlers were considered to be subspecies of the mangrove whistler.

Subspecies
Two subspecies are recognized:
 P. c. cinerea – (Blyth, 1847): Found from northeastern India to Indochina and the Greater Sundas
 Palawan thickhead (P. c. plateni), or Palawan whistler – (Blasius, W, 1888): Originally described as a separate species. Found in Palawan (Philippines)

References

mangrove whistler
Birds of Bangladesh
Birds of Southeast Asia
mangrove whistler
mangrove whistler
Taxonomy articles created by Polbot